The women's singles tennis event of the 2011 Pan American Games was held on October 17–21 at the Telcel Tennis Complex in Guadalajara. The reigning Pan American Games champion, Milagros Sequera of Venezuela, did not defend her title.

Seeds

Draw

Finals

Top half

Bottom half

References 

Women's Singles